The National Association of Assistant United States Attorneys is a professional association founded in 1993 to represent the interests of Assistant U.S. Attorneys —front line federal prosecutors and civil attorneys representing the United States in civil litigation. The organization is dedicated to promoting, protecting and serving the common interests of its members. As of 2018, the union-like organization has over 1,500 members.

The association is managed by a Board of Directors from 17 regions across the country and three at-large directors.

Since its founding, the organization had focused mainly on issues surrounding employment, rather than public policy, but in 2009 the organization urged President Obama to not fire all 93 incumbent U.S. Attorneys, but to keep some of the top performers.  In early 2014, NAAUSA opposed U.S. Department of Justice support for legislation that would soften the use of mandatory minimum sentences for drug offences, after conducting an online poll of AUSAs the previous November. As of May 2017, the association was preparing a policy recommendation on asset forfeiture. They have also opposed portions of the Electronic Communications Privacy Act.

References

United States Attorneys
Legal organizations based in the United States
1993 establishments in the United States
Organizations established in 1993